Noble Lake is a lake in the U.S. state of Montana. The elevation of the lake is 9025 feet.

References

Lakes of Montana
Lakes of Madison County, Montana